Mount Barnard, also named Boundary Peak 160, is a mountain in Alaska and British Columbia, located on the Canada–United States border, and part of the Alsek Ranges of the Saint Elias Mountains. In 1923 Boundary Peak 160 was named Mount Barnard in honour of Edward Chester Barnard, a U.S. Boundary Commissioner from 1915 to 1921 and chief topographer of the United States and Canada Boundary Survey from 1903 to 1915. 
The first ascent of Mount Barnard was made on August 24, 1966, from the head of Tarr Inlet by D. Kenyon King, Peter H. Robinson and David P. Johnston. The details on file with Peak Service at Bartlett Cove, Glacier Bay National Monument, Gustavus, Alaska.

See also
List of Boundary Peaks of the Alaska–British Columbia/Yukon border

References

Mountains of Alaska
Two-thousanders of British Columbia
Saint Elias Mountains
Canada–United States border
International mountains of North America
Mountains of Yakutat City and Borough, Alaska
Mountains of Glacier Bay National Park and Preserve